The Mission sui iuris of Saint Helena, Ascension and Tristan da Cunha is part of the worldwide Catholic Church, under the spiritual leadership of the Pope in Rome. The Mission sui iuris is located in Saint Helena, Ascension and Tristan da Cunha and covering the Islands Saint Helena, Ascension and Tristan da Cunha.

Churches
 There is a Catholic church on St Helena, the Sacred Heart Church in Jamestown. 
 There is a Catholic church on Tristan da Cunha, St Joseph's Catholic Church in Edinburgh of the Seven Seas.
 There is a Catholic church on Ascension, Church of Our Lady of the Ascension in Cat Hill, near Wideawake Airfield.

History
On August 18, 1986 the Mission sui iuris of Saint Helena, Ascension and Tristan da Cunha was established from the Archdiocese of Cape Town in South Africa. From the start, the office of its ecclesiastical superior (also exempt, i.e. immediately subject to the Holy See) has been vested in the Apostolic Prefecture of the Falkland Islands, another UK Southern Atlantic overseas possession.

Leadership
 Prelates of Saint Helena, Ascension and Tristan da Cunha (Roman Rite)
 Mgr. Anton Agreiter, M.H.M. (October 1, 1986 – August 9, 2002)
 Mgr. Michael Bernard McPartland, S.M.A. (August 9, 2002 – 26 October 2016)
 Abbot Hugh David Renwich Turnbull Allan, o.praem  (26 October 2016 – present)

References

External links 

Catholic Church in Saint Helena, Ascension and Tristan da Cunha
Saint Helena
Saint Helena